Belo Blato (or ; , , ,  or ) is a village located in the Zrenjanin municipality, in the Central Banat District of Serbia. It is situated in the autonomous province of Vojvodina. The village is ethnically mixed and its population numbering 1,477 people (2002 census).

Name
In Serbian the village is known as Belo Blato (Бело Блато), in Slovak as Biele Blato or Lízika, in Hungarian as Nagyerzsébetlak, in Banat Bulgarian as Belo-Blato and Liznájt, and in German as Elisenheim.

Ethnic groups (2002 census)

The population of the village include:
 583 (39.47%) Slovaks
 488 (33.04%) Hungarians
 128 (8.67%) Bulgarians
 118 (7.99%) Serbs
 others.

Slovaks and Hungarians in the village speak their native languages and nestle their national cultures, while Bulgarians do not have school classes in their language, which is slowly disappearing.

History

Belo Blato was settled in 1883 by Slovak people from the village of Padina (in south Banat), where Slovaks from Slovakia settled several years earlier. These Slovaks were poor but very active. After few years, they built in a new village the new Evangelical church, house for priest, school for children, and mill. Soon after Slovaks, the Hungarian and Bulgarian settlers settled in Belo Blato as well. They came from neighbouring villages of Mužlja and Lukino Selo.

Historical population

1961: 2,031
1971: 1,841
1981: 1,746
1991: 1,762
2002: 1,477
2011: 1,342

See also
List of places in Serbia
List of cities, towns and villages in Vojvodina

References

 
 
Slobodan Ćurčić, Broj stanovnika Vojvodine, Novi Sad, 1996.

Populated places in Serbian Banat
Zrenjanin
Banat Bulgarian people